The Land Titles Building is located at 311 21st Street East in the Central Business District of Saskatoon, Saskatchewan.   The architectural firm of Storey and Van Egmond designed the building in the Romanesque Revival style.  The building was constructed by Smith Brothers and Wilson in 1909.  Additional expansions were done between 1910 and 1912.  The building housed the land title office until 1959 when the office was transferred to the Law Courts Building.  The provincial government stopped using the building when it was sold in 1994.  The building now houses the law offices of Brayford and Shapiro.

The building was designated a Provincial Heritage Property in 1985.

References 

Buildings and structures in Saskatoon
Buildings and structures completed in 1909
Canadian federal government buildings
Romanesque Revival architecture in Canada